Stefan Hook-Sporry (born 16 August 1995) is a New Zealand cricketer. He made his first-class debut on 1 March 2020, for Central Districts in the 2019–20 Plunket Shield season.

References

External links
 

1995 births
Living people
New Zealand cricketers
Central Districts cricketers
Place of birth missing (living people)